Leiostracus is a genus of small to medium-sized neotropical, air-breathing land snails, pulmonate gastropod mollusks in family Simpulopsidae.

This genus is endemic to South America, occurring in Guyana, Suriname and Brazil.

Species
Species in the genus Leiostracus include:

 Leiostracus carnavalescus Simone & Salvador, 2016
 Leiostracus cinnamomeolineatus (Moricand, 1841)
 Leiostracus clouei (Pfeiffer, 1856)
 Leiostracus coxiranus (Potiez & Michaud, 1835)
 Leiostracus demerarensis (Pfeiffer, 1861)
 Leiostracus faerie Salvador & Cavallari, 2014
 Leiostracus ferreirai (Palma & Brito, 1974) 
 Leiostracus fetidus Salvador & Cavallari, 2014
 Leiostracus goniotropis (Ancey, 1904)
 Leiostracus manoeli (Moricand, 1841)
 Leiostracus melanoscolops (Dohrn, 1882)
 Leiostracus obliquus (Reeve, 1849)
 Leiostracus omphaloides (Menke, 1846)
 Leiostracus onager (Beck, 1837)
 Leiostracus perlucidus (Spix, 1827)
 Leiostracus sarchochilus (Pfeiffer, 1837)
 Leiostracus subtuszonatus (Pilsbry, 1899)
 Leiostracus vimineus (Moricand, 1833)
 Leiostracus vitreus (Spix, 1827)
 Leiostracus vittatus (Spix, 1827)
 Leiostracus webberi Pilsbry, 1939
Species brought into synonymy
 Leiostracus coxeiranus (Moricand, 1836): synonym of Leiostracus coxiranus (Potiez & Michaud, 1835) (junior synonym)
 Leiostracus kugleri Forcart, 1954: synonym of Bostryx kugleri (Forcart, 1954) (original combination)
 Leiostracus polygrammus (Moricand, 1836): synonym of Drymaeus polygramma (S. Moricand, 1836)
 Leiostracus studeri (L. Pfeiffer, 1847): synonym of Drymaeus studeri (L. Pfeiffer, 1847)

References

 Bank, R. A. (2017). Classification of the Recent terrestrial Gastropoda of the World. Last update: July 16, 2017

External links
 Albers, J. C. (1850). Die Heliceen nach natürlicher Verwandtschaft systematisch geordnet. Berlin: Enslin. 262 pp